Tova Dorothea Magnusson (born 18 June 1968), also credited under her former married name as Tova Magnusson Norling, is a Swedish film and television actress; comedian; and film director. She is best known outside Sweden for her role in the Danish-Swedish series The Bridge (2013).

Biography 
She was born in Huddinge and raised in Sorunda, both in Stockholm County, Sweden. She was married to fellow Swedish actor and director Figge Norling from 1992 until their divorce in 2004. They have two children.

Career

Theatre
In 1997, with Simon Norrthorn, Malin Cederblad and Figge Norling, she formed "Gruppen" ("The Group"). Their first production, Clownen luktar bensin, was performed on Boulevardteatern and later moved to radio on Sveriges Radio P3.

Theatre work
Clownen Luktar Bensin (Boulevardteatern)
Speed the Plow by David Mamet (Boulevardteatern, 1999)
Skitungen — En Omöjlig Gosse (Teater Plaza, 2000)

Film and television work 
Magnusson has appeared in over fifteen films and over fifteen television productions. She has also directed several television productions and one film.

Acting

Ha ett Underbart Liv (1992)
Svart Lucia (1992)
Den gråtande ministern (1993) television series
Roseanna (1993)
Brandbilen Som Försvann (1993)
Polis, polis, potatismos (1993)
Mannen på balkongen (1993)
Radioskugga (1995) as Jenny; two episodes, television series
Vi skulle ju bli lyckliga... (1995)
Att Stjäla en Tjuv (1996)
Dödsklockan (1999); television film
Norrmalmstorg (2003); television film
Medicinmannen (2005) (TV-serie) 
Den som viskar (2006)
Keillers park (2006)
Flickan (2009)
En busslast kärlek (2010)
Fyra år till (2010)
Gustafsson (2011) television series
Solsidan (2012) television series
Det knullande paret (2013)
The Bridge (2013) television series
Greyzone (2018)

Directing
Miss Sweden (Fröken Sverige) (2003); drama film
Gynekologen i Askim (2007); television miniseries
Four More Years (Fyra år till) (2010)

See also
 List of female film and television directors
 List of LGBT-related films directed by women

References

External links

1968 births
Living people
People from Huddinge Municipality
Swedish film actresses
Swedish film directors
Swedish stage actresses
Swedish television actresses
Swedish women film directors